(born Yasuo Watanabe (渡部 泰雄, Watanabe Yasuo) ; 22 February 1932 – 11 September 2010) was a Japanese comedian, actor and musician. Born in Tokyo, he learned to play the trombone and, while a student at Chuo University, began playing in jazz bands performing for American soldiers during the Occupation of Japan. He quit university and joined the City Slickers with Frankie Sakai in 1953. In 1956, he joined the comic-jazz band The Crazy Cats with Hajime Hana and Hitoshi Ueki. He came to fame when the Crazy Cats started appearing on television, especially through their variety show "Shabondama Holiday," and in movies, through comedy series such as the "Irresponsible" (Musekinin) series at Toho. Some of his nonsense one-word gags such as "gachon" became buzzwords imitated throughout the nation. He also appeared alone in dramatic roles on film and television, was a regular in the "Tsuribaka Nisshi" film series, and continued to be a popular figure on variety TV.

His real name was Yasuo Watanabe, but his stage name, especially with the Japanese name order "Tani Kei", was based on a pun on the name Danny Kaye.

He died of a brain contusion on 11 September 2010 after falling down the stairs in his Mitaka home.

Selected filmography
 Nippon musekinin jidai (ニッポン無責任時代) (1962)
 Young Season (若い季節)　(1962)
 Zūzūshii yatsu (図々しい奴) (1965)
 Fancy Paradise (1968)
 Kofuku (1981)
 Tokyo Heaven (1990)
 Samurai Fiction (1998)
 After Life (1998)
 Waterboys (2001)
 Swing Girls (2004)
 Blooming Again (2004)
 Chameleon (2008)

Selected television roles
 Monkey (1979) as Daode Tianzun
 Dokuganryū Masamune (1987) as Imai Sōkun

References

External links
 
 

1932 births
2010 deaths
20th-century Japanese male actors
20th-century Japanese musicians
21st-century Japanese male actors
Male actors from Tokyo
Japanese male comedians
Japanese male film actors
Comedians from Tokyo
Musicians from Tokyo
Japanese trombonists
Male trombonists
21st-century Japanese musicians
Crazy Cats members
20th-century Japanese male musicians
21st-century Japanese male musicians